Stanley Cup riot may refer to four riots occurring after the Stanley Cup Finals (two of which have occurred in Montreal and another two in Vancouver):
 1986 riot in Montreal
 1993 riot in Montreal
 1994 riot in Vancouver
 2011 riot in Vancouver